Tourism in Taiwan is one of the major industries and contributor to the economy of Taiwan. In 2015, Taiwan received roughly 10 million international visitors. Tourism affairs are managed by the Tourism Bureau of the Ministry of Transportation and Communications of Taiwan.

Tourist destinations

There are numerous attractions in Taiwan. Major national icons or tourist attractions include:

Tourism Statistics

International Visitors in Taiwan

The top 12 nationalities of international visitors for tourism purpose (pleasure) are:

The top 12 international visitors in Taiwan for all purposes are:

The total tourist arrivals in Taiwan in 2016 was 10.7 million people.

Types of tourism
Tourism in Taiwan is limited to business, pleasure, visiting relatives, conferences, study, exhibitions, medical treatment and others.

There has been a surge in tourism numbers noticeably around election time in Taiwan, especially tourists from China. However, tourists from China have declined significantly since President Tsai Ing-Wen took office in 2016. Tsai is a member of the Democratic Progressive Party, which the Chinese Communist Party opposes. Therefore, the Chinese government has reduced the number of travel visas issued to its citizens to visit Taiwan.

In 2018 TreeHugger ranked Taiwan the #1 agritourism destination in the world.

Domestic tourism
In 2015, 87% of Taiwanese had domestic travel for their tourism activities, in which the Kenting National Park became their most favorite destination. They spent an average of NT$9,323 per capita for each vacation, which was mainly for accommodation expenditure.

Tourism revenue
The 2013 annual income for Taiwan from tourism-related industries topped at NT$366.8 billion (US$12.3 billion), an increase of 4.7% from the previous year. The average daily spending of each tourist in 2013 was US$224.07, a decrease of 4.37% from the previous year.

In 2015, total revenue from tourism amounted US$14.39 billion, with an average daily spending by each visitor of US$208.

The country's authorities have published a program under which foreigners coming on vacation will be given 5 thousand Taiwanese dollars, which is equal to 163 U.S. dollars. The measure aims to increase tourist flow to six million in 2023 and up to 12 million by 2026.

Stay duration
In 2015, the average length of stay for each tourist visiting Taiwan was 6.63 nights.

UNESCO Status
Taiwan has yet to nominate possible inscriptions in any UNESCO networks, such as UNESCO Intangible Cultural Heritage Lists, World Heritage List, World Network of Biosphere Reserves, Creative Cities Network, and Global Geoparks Network, due to China's rejection of the country's entrance to UNESCO. However, in order make use of the conservation concepts achieved by the UNESCO networks, the Bureau of Cultural Heritage under the Ministry of Culture began in 2002 to compile a list of potential world heritage sites in Taiwan with currently 18 entries.

Tourism Infrastructure

International airports

Tourists mainly arrive by air and Taoyuan International Airport serves as the most popular airport bringing international tourists into Taiwan as it is the largest airport in Taiwan and important regional hub. Other major airports in Taiwan which facilitate international visitors include Kaohsiung International Airport servicing southern Taiwan, Taichung Airport servicing central Taiwan and Taipei Songshan Airport servicing central Taipei.

Ground Transportation in Taiwan

Tourists are able to travel around the island by using a wide variety of transportation modes.
The most popular ways are  Taiwan High Speed Rail, conventional trains on  Taiwan Railways, and the metropolitan cities' metro systems such as the Taipei Metro, Taoyuan Metro, and Kaohsiung MRT as a result of multiple transport hubs which allow travellers to easily transfer between the different systems. A tourist buss called "Taiwan Tourist Shuttle" and taxis are also popular.

Gallery

See also

 Visa policy of Taiwan
 Tourism in the People's Republic of China
 Tourism in Japan
 List of tourist attractions in Taiwan

References

External links
 Tourism Bureau, Republic of China (Taiwan)

 
Taiwan